Mandeva IV was the fourth Licchavi king of Nepal with the name Mandeva. He ruled from 875–879.

References

History of Nepal
9th-century Nepalese people
Nepalese monarchs